Angelo Joseph Moretto (born September 18, 1953) is a Canadian retired professional ice hockey forward who played five games in the National Hockey League for the Cleveland Barons and 18 games in the World Hockey Association for the Indianapolis Racers between 1976 and 1979.

Moretto was born in Toronto, Ontario. Moretto married Donna Bucci Moretto in 1977. They have two children, Matthew Moretto and Olivia Moretto.

Career statistics

Regular season and playoffs

External links
 

1953 births
Living people
California Golden Seals draft picks
Canadian ice hockey forwards
Canadian people of Italian descent
Cleveland Barons (NHL) players
Indianapolis Racers players
Michigan Wolverines men's ice hockey players
Oklahoma City Stars players
Phoenix Roadrunners (CHL) players
Salt Lake Golden Eagles (CHL) players
Ice hockey people from Toronto